Karmiel Dance Festival is an annual dance festival in Israel.

History
The Karmiel Dance Festival was inaugurated in 1987. It is held for 3 days and nights in July, and includes dance performances, workshops, and open dance sessions. The festival began as a celebration of Israeli folk dance, but today it features many different dance troupes, attracting dancers and spectators from Israel and overseas. During the festival there are two major competitions: a choreography competition and a folk dance competition. The festival is held in various venues in the city of Karmiel.

See also
Dance in Israel
Culture in Israel

References

External links 
 www.karmielfestival.co.il

Dance festivals in Israel
Northern District (Israel)
Summer events in Israel